was a Japanese hard rock band formed by keyboardist Masashi Okagaki and female vocalist Kazue Akao in Osaka in 1982.

History 
Their musical style was notably under the influence of Rainbow. They released three original albums and a live album before they disbanded in 1992.

Discography

Original albums
 The Endless Basis (1987)
 Honesty (1989)
 Sase (1990)

Others
 Live... Final Class Day (1992, live album)
 Primal (1999, rare tracks)
 Terra Rosa of Angry Waves (2008, re-recordings)

Japanese heavy metal musical groups
Japanese hard rock musical groups
Japanese progressive metal musical groups
Musical groups from Osaka